The Philippine SuperLiga All-Stars was a volleyball selection team composing of players from the Philippine Super Liga (PSL). It competed as a club team in international club tournaments outside the Philippines such as the AVC Club Volleyball Championship and the FIVB Volleyball Women's Club World Championship.

History

2016

Thai-Denmark Super League

The Philippine Super Liga was invited to participate in the 2016 Women's Volleyball Thai-Denmark Super League in Bangkok, Thailand. The league decided to send a selection team instead of one of the clubs competing in the league. The selection of players was done around late February 2016. The team played in the tournament as "Petron-PSL". PSL president Ramon Suzara, who used to be the secretary general of the Philippine Amateur Volleyball Association (PAVA) when the country won the last gold medal in the Southeast Asian Games women's volleyball in 1993, stated in a press release that the PSL All-Stars selection is a "fighting team". The 14-member team, coached by George Pascua of the Petron Tri-Activ Spikers and assisted by Michael Cariño of the Cignal HD Spikers, was announced on March 1, 2016. Pascua appointed Rachel Anne Daquis of the RC Cola-Army Troopers as the team captain.

The PSL All-Stars lost all its group stage matches against Bangkok Glass, Idea Khonkaen and 3BB Nakhonnont, but managed to win at least a set against each of the teams except Idea Khonkaen. The team won in an exhibition game outside the scope of the tournament against the Hong Kong women's national volleyball team which was also held in Bangkok.

Organizers of a volleyball tournament in Croatia has also expressed their interest to invite the PSL All Stars team in a tourney to be held on July, coinciding with the 2016 PSL All Filipino Conference, according to Suzara, who is also the adviser of Larong Volleyball sa Pilipinas, Inc. (LVPI). The team was also invited to participate in a friendly match with the Hong Kong women's national volleyball team on June 12, 2016. The Hong Kong invitation was confirmed. although the match didn't push through.

FIVB Volleyball Women's Club World Championship

The PSL fielded its all-star selection for the 2016 FIVB Volleyball Women's Club World Championship to be hosted at home in Pasay from October 18–23, 2016.

27 players from the 8 participating PSL clubs were invited to participate in tryouts held at the Filoil Flying V Centre to determine 7 Philippine-based players who will compose the team that will participate at the international tournament. Six additional foreign players will be selected by the FIVB. It was planned that starting in July 2016, one player that will be part of the team will be announced to the public every week. Although the first two players, Rachel Anne Daquis and Jovelyn Gonzaga, to form the team was announced earlier on June 30, 2016.

The team management also tapped Japan women's national volleyball team assistant coach Shun Takahashi as a head coach of the team in early September 2016 but Takahashi was later reassigned as 1st assistant coach later in the same month following the appointment of Serbian mentor Moro Branislav as head coach. Branislav was stated to be the first choice coach from the start by the management and was just waiting for the Serbian coach to be available. Daquis was named as the team captain.

On September 30, 2016, the PSL announced that the team will be sponsored by F2 Logistics Philippines, Inc. and will compete under the name "PSL-F2 Logistics Manila". Foton was also named as the official transportation provider while Turkish Airlines was designated as official airlines of the team.

PSL-F2 Logistics Manila lost all of its three games in the preliminary round, only winning a set against Turkish club Eczacıbaşı VitrA, the defending champions. Then they lost to Hisamitsu Springs in the classification round for 5th to 8th place. The Philippine team finished last out of the 8 participating teams in the tournament after losing to Thai club Bangkok Glass in the 7th place playoff.

2017

Asian Women's Club Championship

On May 9, 2017, the PSL announced that the PSL All-Stars would be fielded in the 2017 AVC Women's Club Championship in place of the Foton Tornadoes, after Foton begged off due to its depleted roster. The team played as "Rebisco-PSL Manila" with an All-Filipino lineup coached by Francis Vicente. The team was winless and finished last.

Annual Princess Maha Chakri Sirindhorn's Cup
The PSL participated at the 2017 Annual Princess Maha Chakri Sirindhorn’s Cup Volleyball Tournament in Sisaket, Thailand. In the preliminary round, the team was classified under Group B along with Bangkok Glass and Rangsit University. Shaq delos Santos was the head coach of the team.

On its first game, the team lost its four-set match against Bangkok Glass. They won their next match with straight sets against Rangsit University securing a place in the semifinal stage. It then lost to PEA-Sisaket and was relegated to the match for the bronze medal.

The team secured a 3-1 set victory over Khonkaen Star becoming the first foreign team to win a medal the Thai hosted tournament. This also marked the PSL All-Star team's first medal in an international tournament.

2018
When the Philippine Super Liga adjusted its calendar to align with the scheduling of both the International Volleyball Federation (FIVB) and the Asian Volleyball Confederation for 2018 in November 2017, the league announced that they would be forming a pool of two to three teams where players for the PSL All-Star team will be drawn.

2019
According to the calendar released by the Philippine Super Liga for 2019, a selection team was participate at the 2019 Asian Women's Club Volleyball Championship in China which was planned to primarily compose of players of the PSL Grand Prix 2019 champions backed with players from other PSL teams although no Philippine team joined the tournament. Also from January 19 to 30, 2019, a PSL selection team was scheduled to play exhibition matches and volleyball clinics outside Metro Manila as part of the PSL On Tour.

A selection team was also planned to participate in lieu of Indonesia which reportedly withdrew from the Philippine leg of the ASEAN Grand Prix. Indonesia reverted its decision and entered the tournament.

Two PSL selection teams, Team Sparkle and Team Shine competed in the 2019 PSL Super Cup.

Sponsored names
In most of the tournaments the league selection joined, they competed under a name of a sponsor.
 Petron-PSL (2016 Women's Volleyball Thai-Denmark Super League)
 PSL-F2 Logistics Manila (2016 FIVB Volleyball Women's Club World Championship)
 Rebisco-PSL Manila (2017 Asian Women's Club Volleyball Championship)

Roster

Current
The following is the roster of the PSL All-Stars competing for the Annual H.R.H. Princess Maha Chakri Sirindhorn's Cup.

Head coach:  Shaq Delos Santos

Historical

Head coach:  Francis Vicente

Head coach:  Moro Branislav

Team captains
 Rachel Anne Daquis (2016)
 Mika Reyes (2017)

All-time players

 Carmina Aganon (2016)
 Geneveve Casugod (2017)
 Maria Lourdes Clemente (2017)
 Cha Cruz (2016)
 Rachel Anne Daquis (2016 –2017)
 Rhea Katrina Dimaculangan (2016 –2017)
 Kim Fajardo (2016 – 2017)
 Fatima Bia General (2017)
 Melissa Gohing (2016)
 Jovelyn Gonzaga (2016 – 2017)
 Michele Gumabao (2016)
 April Ross Hingpit (2016)
 Denden Lazaro (2017)
 Aby Maraño (2016 – 2017)
 Stephanie Mercado (2016)
 Frances Xinia Molina (2016 –2017)
 Maika Angela Ortiz (2016 –2017)
 Jeanette Pañaga (2016)
 Aiza Maizo-Pontillas (2016 –2017)
 Jennylyn Reyes (2016)
 Mika Reyes (2016 –2017)
 Alyja Daphne Santiago (2016 –2017)

Imports 

  Tichaya Boonlert (2016)
  Yuri Fukuda (2016)
  Ekaterina Krivets (2016)
  Lynda Morales (2016)
  Stephanie Niemer (2016)
  Yevgeniya Nyukhalova (2016)
  Kristy Lynn Schmieder (2016)
  Lindsay Stalzer (2016)

Head coaches

Fixtures and results

Competitive records

FIVB / AVC tournaments
FIVB Volleyball Women's Club World Championship:

Asian Women's Club Championship:

Other
Volleyball Thai-Denmark Super League:

Annual H.R.H. Princess Maha Chakri Sirindhorn's Cup:

PSL Super Cup

References

Women's volleyball teams in the Philippines
All-Stars
Representative teams of sports leagues